Cross Ranch State Park is a public recreation area covering  on the west bank of the Missouri River  south of Washburn in Oliver County, North Dakota. The Nature Conservancy's Cross Ranch Nature Preserve, a  preserve which features a roaming herd of more than 200 adult bison, lies adjacent to the state park.

History
In the late 1800s, A.G. Gaines, a scout and land agent for the Burlington Northern Railroad, owned an  where the park and preserve now stand. Although the subsequent owners, Bob and Gladys Levis, wished for the land to become a state park, and its purchase was approved by the state legislature in 1979, Bismarck businessman Robert McCarney funded a statewide referral that killed the proposal. The Nature Conservancy purchased the ranch from the Levis in 1982. It then donated land for the state park in 1989, while holding onto  for use as a nature preserve.

Activities and amenities
The state park and nature preserve provide  of trails for hiking and cross-country skiing. The park also offers kayaking, canoeing, cabins, yurts, and campsites.

References

External links
Cross Ranch State Park North Dakota Parks and Recreation Department
Cross Ranch State Park Map North Dakota Parks and Recreation Department
Cross Ranch Preserve The Nature Conservancy

State parks of North Dakota
Protected areas established in 1989
1989 establishments in North Dakota
Protected areas of Oliver County, North Dakota